Kramm  is a surname. Notable people with the surname include: 

Bruno Kramm (born 1967), German musician
Heinz Kramm (born 1938), German singer known as Heino 
Joseph Kramm (1907–1991), American playwright, actor, and director
Kenny Kramm (1961–2016), American entrepreneur